Zaloj  is a village in Croatia. It is within the Sisak-Moslavina County.

References

External links

Populated places in Sisak-Moslavina County
Glina, Croatia